Jestřebí is a municipality and village in Náchod District in the Hradec Králové Region of the Czech Republic. It has about 200 inhabitants. It lies in the Metuje River valley.

References

Villages in Náchod District